Like rational choice theory, conflict theory, or functionalism, pure sociology is a sociological paradigm — a strategy for explaining human behavior.  Developed by Donald Black as an alternative to individualistic and social-psychological theories, pure sociology was initially used to explain variation in legal behavior.  Since then, Black and other pure sociologists have used the strategy to explain terrorism, genocide, lynching, and other forms of conflict management as well as science, art, and religion.

Epistemology 

Pure sociology explains social life with its social geometry.  Social life refers to any instance of human behavior—such as law, suicide, gossip, or art — while the social geometry of a behavior, also called its social structure, refers to the social characteristics of those involved—such as their degree of past interaction or their level of wealth.  To some extent this approach draws from aspects of earlier sociological work, ranging from Durkheim's emphasis on social explanations for individual behavior to later work in the variation of police (and other legal) behavior.

Differences 

Virtually all sociology explains the behavior of people—whether groups or individuals—with some reference to their mental constructs (psychology) or the purposes of their action (teleology). But pure sociology reconceptualizes human behavior as social life—something that does not exist in the mind, is not explainable by the aims of actions, and is supraindividual. Pure sociology, then, can be distinguished from other sociological paradigms by what is absent from it:  psychology, teleology, and even people as such.  Pure sociology's focus on a unique social reality may sound Durkheimian, but Black views the approach as "more Durkheimian than Durkheim."

Explanations 
In [https://www.amazon.com/Behavior-Law-Donald-Black/dp/0121026523 The Behavior of Law], published in 1976, Donald Black introduced the first example of pure sociology—a general theory of law, or governmental social control.  This theory seeks to explain variation in law, and one aspect of legal variation is the amount of law attracted to a case of conflict.  A conflict is a situation where one person has a grievance against another, such as where an assault has occurred or a contract has been broken, and the offended parties may or may not appeal to the police or to the civil courts to resolve it.  Cases may attract law or not, then, and when they do attract law, there may be more or less of it.  When the police make an arrest in an assault case, for instance, there is more law when there is merely a call to the police, and when someone is convicted and sentenced there is more law than when there is merely an arrest.  The pure sociology of law explains this variation by identifying a number of sociological variables that are associated with variation in the quantity of law.  These include various forms of social status (such as wealth, integration, culture, conventionality, organization, and respectability) as well as various forms of social distance (such as relational distance and cultural distance).  These are aspects of the social structures of cases, then, and so cases where the disputants are both high in status have different social structures—and are handled differently—than cases involving low-status disputants.  Whether the disputants are socially close to or distant from one another also determines the amount of law the case attracts.  For example, one of the theory's predictions is that within a society, law varies directly with relational distance.  Relational distance refers to the amount and intensity of interaction between the parties, so the theory predicts that there is more law in conflicts between strangers than in those between intimates.  This aspect of the theory explains numerous facts, such as why those who kill strangers are punished more severely than those who kill intimates and why women who are raped by strangers are more likely to report it to the police.Since the publication of The Behavior of Law, Black and other pure sociologists have applied the theoretical strategy to numerous other subjects.  Most notably, Black has developed a general theory of social control that goes beyond law to explain more generally the handling of all human conflicts.  Most conflicts are handled without appealing to the legal system, and the theory thus explains not just law but avoidance, gossip, therapy, feuding, and numerous other forms of non-governmental social control.  In addition to extending the subject matter, this later work also extends the theory to focus not just on the social characteristics of the initial disputants in a conflict, but also of third parties (all those with knowledge of a conflict).  For example, Mark Cooney examines how third party behavior shapes violence.  Whether and how third parties involve themselves in a conflict can determine not only the likelihood of violence, but also the form the violence takes.  For example, social configurations characterized by close and distant group ties are conducive to feud-like behavior where violence occurs back and forth between groups over a long period of time.  In this situation, third parties are members of groups, and they are relationally close to fellow group members but distant from others.  When conflicts between groups occur, they thus support one side and oppose the other, and they may join in retaliatory violence against members of rival groups.  Other social configurations are conducive to other forms of violence or even to peace.  For example, where there are cross-cutting ties, such as where people are relationally close to members of other groups, third parties are more likely to promote peace.

Recently, Black has moved beyond the study of how conflicts are handled to examine the origin of conflict itself.  Moral Time identifies the causes of clashes of right and wrong in human relationships.  In doing so, this theory invokes a new explanatory concept—the idea of movement in social time — and thus extends the pure sociological approach.

Black and others have also moved beyond conflict and social control to develop explanations of ideas, predation, welfare, research, and other forms of social life.  For example, Black's theory of ideas explains the content of ideas with their social structures.  Just as each conflict has a social structure that consists of the social characteristics of the disputants and third parties, every idea—every statement about reality—has a social structure consisting of the characteristics of the source, subject, and audience.  For example, the subject of an idea may be intimate or distant from the source:  People have ideas about family members and friends as well as strangers.  The subject may also be high or low in social status:  People have ideas about senators and businessmen as well as skid row vagrants.  But ideas vary depending on their social structures.  Black's explanation of voluntarism and determinism, for example, states that ideas about high status subjects are more likely to be voluntaristic (to invoke free will).  The theory would predict, then, that people would offer voluntaristic explanations of senators and businessmen and deterministic explanations of skid row vagrants.

 Practitioners and scholars 

A number of sociologists have used at least some elements of Black's theoretical strategy in their work, including Professors M.P. Baumgartner, Marian Borg, Bradley Campbell, Mark Cooney, Ellis Godard, Allan Horwitz, Scott Jacques, Marcus Kondkar, Jason Manning, Joseph Michalski, Calvin Morrill, Scott Phillips, Roberta Senechal de la Roche, and James Tucker.

 Criticism 
While prominent sociologists such as Randall Collins, Karen A. Cerulo, David Sciulli, and Jonathan H. Turner have praised aspects of pure sociology, the approach has also been criticized. Kam C. Wong criticizes pure sociology's scientism, David F. Greenberg its use of covering-law explanations, and Thomas J. Scheff its attempt at disciplinary purity. In a 2008 symposium, Douglas A. Marshall  offers an extended critique of the system.  Marshall argues that, contrary to Black's stated goal of making sociology more scientific, his approach is actually antithetical to modern scientific values and practices—a theme reiterated by Stephen Turner in the same symposium.

Response to criticism
Mark Cooney, Allan Horwitz, and Joseph Michalski have responded to some specific criticisms of pure sociology, while Donald Black, in "The Epistemology of Pure Sociology" as well as other writings, has responded generally to critics' claims and provided an extensive defense of the pure sociological approach.

Noting the ideological nature of many of the attacks, Black says that his theory is in fact "politically and morally neutral."  But according to Black, it nonetheless attracts politicized hostility due to its unconventionality:

"My work is shocking not because it is politically incorrect, but because it is epistemologically incorrect.  It violates conventional conceptions of social reality in general and legal and moral reality in particular.  It therefore shocks — epistemologically shocks — many on whom it is inflicted.  If I disturb your universe I may be worthy of contempt.  I may appear to be your favorite political enemy, a conservative if you are radical, a radical if you are conservative."

Black also discusses the aims of the approach.  While it is unconventional sociology, it is conventional science, striving to provide simple, general, testable, valid, and original explanations of reality.  And it is by these criteria alone, Black maintains, that it should be judged:

"If you wish to criticize my work, tell me you can predict and explain legal and related behavior better than I can.  Tell me my work is not as testable as something else, tell me it is not as general as something else, tell me it is less elegant than something else, tell me that it has already been published, or just tell me it is wrong.  Tell me something relevant to what I am trying to accomplish — something scientific."

References

Further reading
Baumgartner, M.P.

 1978.	“Law and social status in colonial New Haven.”  Pages 153-178 in Research in Law and Sociology:  An Annual Compilation of Research, Vol. 1, edited by Rita J. Simon.  Greenwich:  JAI Press.
 1984.	“Social Control from Below.” Toward a General Theory of Social Control, Volume 1:  Fundamentals, edited by Donald Black.  Orlando:  Academic Press.
 1984.	“Social Control in Suburbia.” In Toward a General Theory of Social Control, Volume 2:  Selected Problems, edited by Donald Black.  Orlando:  Academic Press.
 1985.	“Law and the Middle Class:  Evidence from a Suburban Town.”  Law and Human Behavior 9(1):3-24.
 1987.	“Utopian justice:  the covert facilitation of white-collar crime.”  Journal of Social Issues 43:61-69.
 1988.	The Moral Order of a Suburb.  New York:  Oxford University Press.
 1992.	“War and Peace in Early Childhood.”  Pages 1–38 in Virginia Review of Sociology:  Law and Conflict Management, edited by James Tucker.  Greenwich, CT:  JAI Press Inc.
 1992.	“Violent networks:  The origins and management of domestic conflict.”  Pages 209-231 in Aggression and Violence:  The Social Interactionist Perspective, edited by Richard B. Felson and James T. Tedeschi.  Washington D.C.:  American Psychological Association.
 1993.	“On the Overlegalized Conception of Modern Society.”  Contemporary Sociology 22(3):336-337.
 1993.	“The myth of discretion.”  Pages 129-162 in The Uses of Discretion, edited by Keith Hawkins.  Oxford:  Oxford University Press.
 1996.	“A Better Place to Live:  Reshaping the American Suburb.”  Contemporary Sociology 25(2):222-224.
 1998.	“The Moral Voice of the Community.” Sociological Focus 31(2):??-??. (editor)
 1999.	The Social Organization of Law.  San Diego:  Academic Press.
 1999.	“Introduction.”  Pages 1–8 in The Social Organization of Law, edited by M.P. Baumgartner.  San Diego, Academic Press (second edition; first edition, 1973).
 2001.	“The sociology of law in the United States.”  The American Sociologist 32(Summer):99-113.  Thematic Issue:  The Sociology of Law, edited by A. Javier Trevino.
 2002.	“‘The Behavior of Law’, or How to Sociologize with a Hammer.”  Contemporary Sociology 31(6):644-649.

Black, Donald

 1970.	“Production of Crime Rates.”  American Sociological Review 35:733-748.
 1971.	“The Social Organization of Arrest.”  Stanford Law Review 23:1087-1111.
 1972.	“The Boundaries of Legal Sociology.”  Yale Law Journal 81:1086-1100.
 1973.	“The Mobilization of Law.”  Journal of Legal Studies 2:125-149.
 1973.	“Introduction.”  Pages 1–14 in The Social Organization of Law, edited by Donald Black and Maureen Mileski.  New York:  Academic Press.
 1976.	The Behavior of Law.  New York:  Academic Press.
 1979.	“Common Sense in the Sociology of Law.”  American Sociological Review 44(1):18-27.
 1979.	“A Note on the Measurement of Law.”  Informationsbrief für Rechtssoziologie, Sonderheft 2:92-106.
 1979. “A Strategy of Pure Sociology.” Pages 149-168 in Theoretical Perspectives in Sociology, edited by Scott G. McNall. New York: St. Martin's Press.
 1980.	The Manners and Customs of the Police.  New York:  Academic Press.
 1981.	“The Relevance of Legal Anthropology.”  Contemporary Sociology 10(1):43-46.
 1983.	“Crime as Social Control.”  American Sociological Review 48:34-45.
 1984.	Toward a General Theory of Social Control, Volume 1:  Fundamentals.  Orlando:  Academic Press. (editor)
 1984.	“Preface.” Toward a General Theory of Social Control, Volume 1:  Fundamentals, edited by Donald Black.  Orlando:  Academic Press.
 1984.	“Social Control as a Dependent Variable.”  In Toward a General Theory of Social Control, Volume 1:  Fundamentals, edited by Donald Black.  Orlando:  Academic Press.  (editor)
 1984.	Toward a General Theory of Social Control, Volume 2:  Selected Problems.  Orlando:  Academic Press.  (editor)
 1984.	“Preface.” Toward a General Theory of Social Control, Volume 2:  Selected Problems, edited by Donald Black.  Orlando:  Academic Press.
 1984.	“Crime as Social Control.”  Pages 1–27 in Toward a General Theory of Social Control, Volume 2:  Selected Problems, edited by Donald Black.  Orlando:  Academic Press.
 1984.	“Jurocracy in America.”  The Tocqueville Review – La Revue Tocquevelle 6:273-281.
 1987.	“Compensation and the Social Structure of Misfortune.” Law & Society Review 21(4):563-584.
 1987.	“A Note on the Sociology of Islamic Law.”  Pages 47–62 in Perspectives on Islamic Law, Justice and Society, edited by Ravindra S. Khare.  Working Papers, Number 3.  Charlottesville:  Center for Advanced Studies University of Virginia.
 1989.	Sociological Justice.  New York:  Oxford University Press.
 1990.	“The Elementary Forms of Conflict Management.”  In New Direction in the Study of Justice, Law, and Social Control, prepared by the School of Justice Studies, Arizona State University.  New York:  Plenum Press.
 1991.	“Relative Justice.”  Litigation 18:32-35.
 1992.	“Social Control of the Self.”  Pages 39–49 in Virginia Review of Sociology:  Law and Conflict Management, edited by James Tucker.  Greenwich:  JAI Press Inc.
 1993.	“La Mobilisation du Droit:  Autobiographie d’un Concept:  (The Mobilization of Law:  Autobiography of a Concept”).  Pages 376-378 in Dictionnaire Encyclopédique de Théorie et de Sociologie de Droit, under the direction of André-Jean Arnaud.  Paris:  Librairie, Générale de Droit et de Jurisprudence.
 1995.	“The Epistemology of Pure Sociology.”  Law and Social Inquiry 20:829-870.\
 1997.	“The Lawyerization of Legal Sociology.”  Amici (Newsletter of the Sociology of Law Section, American Sociological Association) 5:4-7.
 1998.	The Social Structure of Right and Wrong.  San Diego:  Academic Press.
 2000.	“On the Origin of Morality.”  Journal of Consciousness Studies 7:107-1191.
 2000.	“The Purification of Sociology.”  Contemporary Sociology 29(5):704-709.
 2000.	“Dreams of Pure Sociology.”  Sociological Theory 18(3):343-367.
 2002.	“The Geometry of Law:  An Interview with Donald Black”, by Aaron Bell.  International Journal of the Sociology of Law 30:101-129.
 2002.	“Terrorism as Social Control.  Part I:  The Geometry of Destruction.”  American Sociological Association Crime, Law, and Deviance Newsletter Spring:3-5.
 2002.	“Terrorism as Social Control.  Part II:  The Geometry of Retaliation.”  American Sociological Association Crime, Law, and Deviance Newsletter Summer:3-5.
 2002.	“Pure Sociology and the Geometry of Discovery.”  In Toward a New Science of Sociology:  A Retrospective Evaluation of The Behavior of Law, by Allan V. Horwitz.  Contemporary Sociology 31(6):668-674.
 2004.	“The Geometry of Terrorism.”  In “Theories of Terrorism,” symposium edited by Roberta Senechal de la Roche.  Sociological Theory 22:14-25.
 2004.	“Violent Structures.”  Pages 145-158 in Violence:  From Theory to Research, edited by Margaret A. Zahn, Henry H. Brownstein, and Shelly L. Jackson.  Cincinnati:  Anderson Publishing Company.
 2004.	“Terrorism as Social Control.”  In Terrorism and Counter-Terrorism:  Criminological Perspectives, edited by Mathieu Deflem.  New York:  Elsevier Ltd.
 2007.	“Legal Relativity.” In the Encyclopedia of Law and Society: American and Global Perspectives, Volume 3, edited by David S. Clark. Thousand Oaks, CA: Sage Publications.
 2010.  “How Law Behaves:  An Interview with Donald Black,” by Mara Abramowitz.  International Journal of Law, Crime and Justice 38:37-47.
 2010.  The Behavior of Law (Special Edition).  Bingley, England:  Emerald.
 2011.  Moral Time.  New York:  Oxford University Press.

Black, Donald and M.P. Baumgartner
 1983.	“Toward a Theory of Third Party.”  Pages 84–114 in Empirical Theories about Courts, edited by Keith O. Boyum and Lynn Mather.  New York:  Longman.
 1987.	“On Self-Help In Modern Society.”  Dialectical Anthropology 12:33-44.  Also, pages 193-208 in The Manners and Customs of the Police, by Donald Black.  New York:  Academic Press.

Borg, Marian J.
 1992.	“Conflict Management in the Modern World-System.” Sociological Forum 7(2):261-282.
 1998. “Vicarious Homicide Victimization and Support for Capital Punishment: A Test of Black's Theory of Law.”  Criminology 36:537-567.
 2000.	“Drug testing in organizations: applying Horwitz’s theory of the effectiveness of social control.” Deviant Behavior 21:123-154.

Borg, Marian J. and William P. Arnold III
 1997.	“Social Monitoring as Social Control: The Case of Drug Testing in a Medical Workplace.” Sociological Forum 12(3):441-460.

Borg, Marian J. and Karen F. Parker
 2001. “Mobilizing Law in Urban Areas:  The Social Structure of Homicide Clearance Rates.”  Law and Society Review 35:435-466.

Campbell, Bradley
 2009. “Genocide as Social Control.”  Sociological Theory 27(2):150-172.
 2010. “Contradictory Behavior During Genocides.”  Sociological Forum 25(2):296-314.
 2010. “Review of Is Killing Wrong?”  Social Forces 89(2):720-721.
 2011. “Black's Theory of Law and Social Control.”  In Oxford Bibliographies Online: Criminology, edited by Richard Rosenfeld.
 Forthcoming.  "Genocide as a Matter of Degree." British Journal of Sociology.Cooney, Mark
 1986.	“Behavioural Sociology of Law:  A Defence.”  The Modern Law Review 49(2):262-271.
 1989.	“Legal Secrets:  Equality and Efficiency in the Common Law.”  American Journal of Sociology 95(2):536-537.
 1992.	“Racial Discrimination in Arrest.”  Pages 99–119 in Virginia Review of Sociology:  Law and Conflict Management, edited by James Tucker.  Greenwich, CT:  JAI Press Inc.
 1993.	“Why is Economic Analysis So Appealing to Law Professors?”  Stanford Law Review 45(6):2211-2230.
 1994.  "The Informal Social Control of Homicide."  Journal of Legal Pluralism and Unofficial Law 34:31-59.
 1994.	“Evidence as Partisanship.”  Law and Society Review 28(4):833-858.
 1995.	“The Struggle for Control:  A Study of Law, Disputes, and Deviance.”  Social Forces 73(3):1174-1175.
 1997.	“From Warre to Tyranny:  Lethal Conflict and the State.”  American Sociological Review 62(2):316-338.
 1997.	“The decline of elite homicide.”  Criminology 35:381-407.
 1997.	“Hunting among police and predators: The enforcement of traffic law.” Studies in Law, Politics, and Society 16: 165-188.
 1998.	Warriors and Peacemakers:  How Third Parties Shape Violence.  New York:  New York University Press.
 1998.	"The Dark Side of Community: Moralistic Homicide and Strong Social Ties." Sociological Focus 31: 135-153.
 2001.	"Legal Aspects of Feud/Internal War." Section 3.8 in International Encyclopedia of the Social and Behavioral Sciences, edited by Neil J. Smelser and Paul B. Baltes.
 2002.	“Still Paying the Price of Heterodoxy:  ‘The Behavior of Law’ a Quarter-Century On.”  Contemporary Sociology 31(6):658-661.
 2003.	“The Privatization of Violence.” Criminology 41(4):1377-1406.
 2006.	“The Criminological Potential of Pure Sociology.” Crime, Law and Social Change 46:51-63.
 2009. “Ethnic Conflict Without Ethnic Groups:  A Study in Pure Sociology.” British Journal of Sociology 60:473-492.
 2009. “The Scientific Significance of Collins's Violence.”  British Journal of Sociology 60:586-594.
 2009. Is Killing Wrong? A Study in Pure Sociology.  Charlottesville:  University of Virginia Press.

Cooney, Mark and Scott Phillips
 2002.	“Typologizing Violence:  A Blackian Perspective.”  International Journal of Sociology and Social Policy 22(7/8):75-108

Geiger-Oneto, Stephanie and Scott Phillips
 2003.  “Driving While Black:  The Role of Race, Sex, and Social Status.”  Journal of Ethnicity in Criminal Justice 1(2):1-25.

Godard, Ellis
 2003.	“Reel life:  the social geometry of reality shows.”  Pages 73–96 in Survivor Lessons:  Essays on Communication and Reality Television, edited by Matthew J. Smith and Andrew F. Wood.  Jefferson, NC:  McFarland & Company.

Hawdon, James and John Ryan
 2009. “Hiding in Plain Sight:  Community Organization, Naive Trust and Terrorism.”  Current Sociology 57:323-343.

Hembroff, Larry A.
 1987. “The Seriousness of Acts and Social Contexts:  A Test of Black's Theory of the Behavior of Law.”  American Journal of Sociology 93:322-347.

Hoffmann, Heath C.
 2006.  “Criticism as Deviance and Social Control in Alcoholics Anonymous.”  Journal of Contemporary Ethnography 35:669-695

Horwitz, Allan V.
 1982.	The Social Control of Mental Illness.  New York:  Academic Press.
 1982-3.	“Resistance to innovation in the sociology of law:  a reply to Greenberg.” Law and Society Review 17:369-384.
 1984.	“Therapy and Social Solidarity.” Toward a General Theory of Social Control, Volume 1:  Fundamentals, edited by Donald Black.  Orlando:  Academic Press.
 1990.	The Logic of Social Control.  New York:  Plenum Press.
 1995.	“Diversion in the juvenile justice system and a sociological theory of social control.”  Pages 17–34 in Diversion and Informal Social Control, edited by Günter Albrecht and Wolfgang Ludwig-Mayerhofer.  Berlin:  Walter de Gruyter.  (editor)
 2002.	“A Continuities Symposium on Donald Black’s The Behavior of Law.”  Contemporary Sociology 31(November):641-674. (editor)
 2002.	“Toward a New Science of Social Life:  A Retrospective Examination of ‘The Behavior of Law’.”  Contemporary Sociology 31(6):641-644.
 2002.	Creating Mental Illness.  Chicago:  University of Chicago Press.

Jacques, Scott, and Richard Wright
 2008. "Intimacy with Outlaws: The Role of Relational Distance in Recruiting, Paying, and Interviewing Underworld Research Participants." Journal of Research in Crime and Delinquency 45:22-38.
 2008.  "The Relevance of Peace to Studies of Drug Market Violence."  Criminology 46:221-253.
 2009. "Drug Law and Violent Retaliation." In 'Criminology and Public Policy: Putting Theory to Work', 2nd ed., eds. Hugh Barlow and Scott Decker. Philadelphia, PA: Temple University Press.
 2010. "Apprehending Criminals: The Impact of Law on Offender-Based Research." In 'Offenders on Offending: Learning About Crime from Criminals', ed. Wim Bernasco. Cullompton, UK: Willan Publishing.
 2010. "Right or Wrong? Toward a Theory of IRBs’ (Dis)Approval of Research." Journal of Criminal Justice Education 21:42-59.
 2010. "Criminology as Social Control:  Discriminatory Research and Its Role in the Reproduction of Social Inequalities and Crime."  Crime, Law and Social Change 53:383-396.
 2010. "A Sociological Theory of Drug Sales, Gifts, and Frauds."  Crime and Delinquency 20(10): 1-26.
 2010. "Dangerous Intimacy: Toward a Theory of Violent Victimization in Active Offender Research." Journal of Criminal Justice Education 21: 503-525.

Kan, Yee W. and Scott Phillips
  2003.  “Race and the Death Penalty:  Including Asian Americans and Exploring the Desocialization of Law.”  Journal of Ethnicity in Criminal Justice 1:63-92.

Kruttschnitt, Candace
  1980-81.  “Social Status and Sentences of Female Offenders.”  Law & Society Review 15:247-266.
  1982.  “Women, Crime, and Dependency:  An Application of the Theory of Law.”  Criminology 19:495-513.
  1982.  “Respectable Women and the Law.”  The Sociological Quarterly 23:221-234.
  1985.  “Are Businesses Treated Differently? A Comparison of the Individual Victim and the Corporate Victim in the Criminal Courtroom.”  Sociological Inquiry 55:225-238.

Kuan, Ping-Yin
 2004. “Peace, Not War:  Adolescents' Management of Intergenerational Conflict in Taiwan.” Journal of Comparative Family Studies 35:591-614.

Lally, William E. and Alfred DeMaris
2012. "Arresting the Perpetrator in Intimate-Partner Violence: A Comparative Analysis of Gender and Relational Distance Effects."  Crime and Delinquency 58(1): 103-123.
 
Lee, Catherine
  2005. “The Value of Life in Death:  Multiple Regression and Event History Analyses of Homicide Clearance in Los Angeles County.”  Journal of Criminal Justice 33:527-534.

Manning, Jason
 Forthcoming. “Suicide as Social Control.”  Sociological Forum.Marshall, Douglas A.
2008. “The Dangers of Purity: On the Incompatibility of ‘Pure Sociology’ and Science” The Sociological Quarterly 49(2): 209-235.
 2008. “Taking the Rhetoric out of Theoretic Debate: A Rejoinder to Michalski” The Sociological Quarterly 49(2): 275-284.

Michalski, Joseph H.
 2003.	“Financial Altruism or Unilateral Resource Exchanges? Toward a Pure Sociology of Welfare." Sociological Theory 21(4):341-358.
 2004.  “Making Sociological Sense out of Trends in Intimate Partner Violence:  The Social Structure of Violence Against Women.”  Violence Against Women 10:652-675.
 2005.  “Explaining Intimate Partner Violence:  The Sociological Limitations of Victimization Studies.”  Sociological Forum 20:613-640.
 2008. “Scientific Discovery in Deep Social Space:  Sociology Without Borders." Canadian Journal of Sociology 33:521-553.
 2008. “The Social Life of Pure Sociology.”  The Sociological Quarterly 49:253-274.

Mileski, Maureen
  1971.  “Courtroom Encounters:  An Observation Study of a Lower Criminal Court.”  Law & Society Review 5:473-538.

Morrill, Calvin
 1989.	“The management of managers:  disputing in an executive hierarchy.”  Sociological Forum 4:387-407.
 1992.	“Vengeance among Executives.”  Pages 51–76 in Virginia Review of Sociology:  Law and Conflict Management, edited by James Tucker.  Greenwich, CT:  JAI Press Inc.
 1995.	The Executive Way: Conflict Management in Corporations. Chicago, IL: The University of Chicago Press.

Mullis, Jeffrey
 1995.  “Medical Malpractice, Social Structure, and Social Control.”  Sociological Forum 10:135-163.

Peterson, Elicka S.
 1999. “Murder as Self-Help:  Women and Intimate Partner Violence.”  Homicide Studies 3:30-46.

Phillips, Scott
 2003.	“The Social Structure of Vengeance:  A Test of Black’s Model.”  Criminology 41(3):673-708.
 2008. “Racial Disparities in Capital Punishment:  Blind Justice Requires a Blindfold.”  American Constitution Society for Law and Policy Issue Briefs.

Phillips, Scott and Mark Cooney
 2005.	“Aiding Peace, Abetting Violence:  Third Parties and the Management of Conflict.”  American Sociological Review 70:334-354.

Senechal de la Roche, Roberta
 1995.	“Beyond the Behavior of Law.”  Law and Social Inquiry 20(3):777-785.
 1996.	“Collective Violence as Social Control.”  Sociological Forum 11(1):97-128.
 1997.	“The sociogenesis of lynching.”  Pages 48–76 in Under Sentence of Death:  Lynching in the South, edited by W. Fitzhugh Brundage.  Chapel Hill:  University of North Carolina Press.
 2001.	“Why is Collective Violence Collective?”  Sociological Theory 19(2):126-144.
 2004.	“Modern lynchings.”  Pages 213-225 in Violence: From Theory to Research, edited by Margaret A. Zahn, Henry H. Brownstein, and Shelly L. Jackson.  Cincinnati: Anderson Publishing Company.

Silberman, Matthew
 1985.  The Civil Justice Process: A Sequential Model of the Mobilization of Law. Academic Press.

Tucker, James
 1989. “Employee theft as social control.”  Deviant Behavior 10:319-334.
 1992. Virginia Review of Sociology:  Law and Conflict Management.  Greenwich, CT:  JAI Press Inc. (editor)
 1992. “Preface.” Page ix in Virginia Review of Sociology:  Law and Conflict Management, edited by James Tucker.  Greenwich, CT:  JAI Press Inc.
 1993. “Everyday forms of employee resistance.”  Sociological Forum 8:25-45.
 1999. The Therapeutic Corporation.  New York:  Oxford University Press.
 1999. “Therapy, organization, and the state:  a Blackian perspective.”  Pages 78–87 in Counseling and the Therapeutic State, edited by James J. Chriss.  New York:  Aldine de Gruyter.
 1999. “Worker deviance as social control.” Research in the Sociology of Work 8:1-16.
 2002.	“Becoming a Pure Sociologist.”  Contemporary Sociology 31(6):661-664.
 2002. “New Age religion and the cult of the self.” Society  January/February: 46-51.
 2004. “How not to explain murder.” Global Crime 6, 2: 235-243.
 2004. “New Age Healers and the Therapeutic Culture.”  Pages 153-169 in The Therapeutic Culture, edited by Jonathan Imber.  New Brunswick: Transaction Publishers.

Tucker, James and Susan Ross
 2004.	“Corporal punishment and Black’s theory of social control.”  In Corporal Punishment in Theoretical Perspective, edited by Michael J. Donnelly and Murray A. Strauss.  New Haven:  Yale University Press.

Wong, Kam C.
 1995.  “Black's Theory on the Behavior of Law Revisited.” International Journal of the Sociology of Law 23:189-232.

Wong, Siu Kwong
 2010.  “Crime Clearance Rates in Canadian Municipalities: A Test of Donald Black's Theory of Law.” International Journal of Law, Crime, and Justice'' 38:17-36.

Sociological theories
Rational choice theory